Apollinaris may refer to:

Personal name

 Apollinaris, a correspondent of Pliny the Younger (61–c. 112)
 Apollinaris of Ravenna (flourished 1st or 2nd century), martyr and first bishop of Ravenna, the most prominent of several saints called Apollinaris
 Apollinarius (astrologer), a first or second century AD astrologer
 Apollinaris Claudius, Apollinaris of Hierapolis or Apollinaris the Apologist (flourished 2nd century), bishop of Hierapolis and saint
 Apollinaris (the Elder) (flourished 4th century), Christian grammarian
 Apollinaris of Laodicea or the Younger, also known as Apollinarius of Laodicea (died 390), bishop of Laodicea in Syria, author of the heresy of Apollinarism
 Apollinaris Syncletica, also known as Dorotheus (5th century), female desert ascetic, Catholic and Eastern Orthodox saint
 Apollinaris of Clermont (died 515), son of Sidonius Apollinaris
 Apollinarius (governor), Byzantine governor of the Balearic Islands (flourished 530s)
 Patriarch Apollinarius of Alexandria (died 569), Greek Patriarch of Alexandria
 Apollinaris of Valence (453–520), bishop of Valence and saint
 Saint Apollinaris of Monte Cassino (died 827 or 828), abbot of Monte Cassino
 Saint Apollinaris of Sarsina (flourished 1158), bishop of Sarsina
 Blessed Apollinaris Franco (died 1622), Franciscan friar, martyred in Japan, see list of saints and blesseds in the 17th century

Ancient Rome
 Sidonius Apollinaris (died before 490), Gallo-Roman writer, bishop and saint
 Sulpicius Apollinaris, 2nd century Latin grammarian from Carthage
 Legio XV Apollinaris, a Roman legion

Other uses
 Apollinaris (water), a German effervescent mineral water named after Saint Apollinaris of Ravenna
Lily of the valley of Convallaria majalis, flowering plant also historically known as Apollonaris

See also
 Apollonius (disambiguation)
 Appolinaire (disambiguation), including Apollinaire, Apolinare or Apolinaire
 Apolinar, a given name
 Apolinary, also spelled Apollinary, a given name
 Apolinario Mabini (1864–1903), Filipino philosopher, politician and revolutionary
 Apollinarism, a Christological heresy